The Palestrina Pietà is a marble sculpture of the Italian Renaissance, dating from c. 1555 and now in the Galleria dell'Accademia, Florence. It was formerly attributed to Michelangelo, but now it is mostly considered to have been completed by someone else, such as Niccolò Menghini or Gian Lorenzo Bernini. According to the Galleria dell'Accademia, the sculpture's "attribution to the master is still somehow controversial".

This Pietà depicts three figures, one of them the body of Jesus Christ. The sculpture was originally in a room beside the Santa Rosalia church in Palestrina and was owned by the Barberini family. Some sources indicate it was made in 1556. The sculpture was acquired by the government in 1939. The attribution to Michelangelo was made in the first half of the 18th century. There is no earlier discussion of the work as there is for nearly all others attributed to the master.

See also
List of statues of Jesus
List of works by Michelangelo

References

External links

Palestrina Pietà
The Palestrina Pietà

Sculptures attributed to Michelangelo
1550s sculptures
Marble sculptures in Italy
Sculptures of the Galleria dell'Accademia
Sculptures of the Pietà